Teenage Dream: The Complete Confection is a reissue of American singer-songwriter Katy Perry's third studio album, Teenage Dream (2010). It was released on March 23, 2012, by Capitol Records, nearly two years after the original album. Perry collaborated with producers including Tricky Stewart to refine leftover material from the recording sessions at Playback Recording Studio for Teenage Dream. The final product features three newly recorded songs, which incorporate pop styles previously seen in the original album, an acoustic version of "The One That Got Away" and three additional official remixes.

Upon its release, Teenage Dream: The Complete Confection was met with generally favorable reviews from music critics, who were ambivalent towards the new songs' production but questioned the decision to reissue Teenage Dream. As an independent release, the reissue reached the top ten in Australia, New Zealand, the United Kingdom and the United States. It has sold one million copies globally by the end of 2012.

Two singles were released from Teenage Dream: The Complete Confection. The lead single, "Part of Me", debuted at number one on the U.S. Billboard Hot 100, and was eventually certified double-platinum by the Recording Industry Association of America (RIAA), while the second single, "Wide Awake", peaked at number two in the country. The record was further promoted with live performances during the 54th Annual Grammy Awards and the 2012 Billboard Music Awards, in addition to the autobiographical documentary film Katy Perry: Part of Me (2012).

Background
In August 2010, Perry released her third studio album Teenage Dream. While recording the record, she collaborated with producers including Dr. Luke and Max Martin. Following its release, Teenage Dream became a worldwide commercial success; it debuted at number one on both the U.S. Billboard 200 and the UK Albums Chart, and charted highly in other international territories. The project was met with generally mixed reviews from music critics, receiving an average score of 52, based on 19 reviews on Metacritic, indicating "generally mixed or average reviews". After its singles "California Gurls", "Teenage Dream", "Firework", "E.T.", and "Last Friday Night (T.G.I.F.)" each reached the top of the U.S. Billboard Hot 100, Teenage Dream became the second album in history to produce five number-one singles on the chart after Michael Jackson's Bad.

In October 2011, producer Tricky Stewart confirmed that he was working with Perry to refine leftover material from Teenage Dream recording sessions for "something special she has going on". Perry officially announced Teenage Dream: The Complete Confection in February 2012, describing it as the "complete story" of the original album. She added that the expanded album would contain three newly recorded songs and four additional remixes to supplement the standard edition of the original album. "It was an incredible honor to tie [Jackson's] Billboard Hot 100 record, but I'm moving forward and had a few things left to get off my chest," she said.

New material

Tricky Stewart stated that he and Perry "always knew that the records [they] created were special [and] at the time it was more contractual obligation [that they did not make the album]". He elaborated that they were originally excluded from the project to balance the original record with tracks from other producers, in addition to Perry not needing more songs at the time. The expanded album begins with the twelve tracks included on the standard version of Teenage Dream. The newly recorded material for the reissue, which is made just for the album, begins with an acoustic rendition of "The One That Got Away" as the thirteenth track. "Part of Me" is a power pop song that lyrically acts as an "emotional breakup anthem". It was speculated that its concept was inspired by Perry's relationship with her ex-husband Russell Brand.

"Wide Awake" is a mid-tempo pop ballad that sees inspiration from electronic and dance-pop; it lyrically discusses the end of a relationship, and was also reportedly influenced by Perry's experience with Brand. "Dressin' Up" is an uptempo, dance-rock and techno song that sees the inclusion of "over-sexualized" lyrical content. The seventeenth track is a remix of "E.T." with new verses provided by Kanye West, while the eighteenth song is a remix of "Last Friday Night (T.G.I.F.)" featuring Missy Elliott. The nineteenth and final track "Tommie Sunshine's Megasix Smash-Up" incorporates elements of Perry's earlier singles "California Gurls", "Teenage Dream", "Firework", "E.T.", "Last Friday Night (T.G.I.F.)", and "The One That Got Away".

Singles and promotion

"Part of Me" was serviced as the lead single from Teenage Dream: The Complete Confection on February 13, 2012. It was met with generally favorable reviews from music critics, and became the twentieth song in the history of Billboard to debut at number one on the U.S. Billboard Hot 100, and was also certified double-platinum by the Recording Industry Association of America (RIAA) for exceeding sales of two million copies. The track also peaked at number one in New Zealand, and performed moderately in other international territories. "Wide Awake" was released as the second and final single from The Complete Confection on May 22, 2012. It peaked at number two on the Billboard Hot 100, and charted moderately worldwide. The track was nominated for the Grammy Award for Best Pop Solo Performance at the 2013 ceremony, but lost to "Set Fire to the Rain" by Adele.

Perry performed "Part of Me" at the 54th Annual Grammy Awards on February 12, 2012, and sang "Wide Awake" at the 2012 Billboard Music Awards on May 20. The Complete Confection was also promoted through the feature film Katy Perry: Part of Me (2012), which followed Perry during her California Dreams Tour. A golden ticket to attend the premiere of the film was placed inside one American copy and one Canadian copy of the record.

Critical reception

Melissa Maerz of Entertainment Weekly opined that the newly recorded material "runs stale", but stated that the disc contained "some delectable musical snacks" including "Dressin' Up" and the acoustic version of "The One That Got Away". Writing for PopMatters, Jesse Fox felt that the record is "obviously not perfect", but suggested that its enjoyable nature helped Perry "[pull] it off like a bright, flamboyant, short-lived, explosive, nearly abrasive, gasps-inspiring firework." A writer for Blogcritics appreciated The Complete Confections musical diversity, and thought that the lyrical content made the album a "journey in love, life and everything in between."

Commercial performance
In the United States, Teenage Dream: The Complete Confection boosted sales of the original Teenage Dream, which consequently re-entered the top-ten of the Billboard 200 at number seven with first-week sales of 33,000 copies. This resulted in a 190%-increase from the previous tracking week, in which the original album stood at number 31. A similar situation occurred on the UK Albums Chart, where The Complete Confection helped Teenage Dream rise from number 34 to number six after the former was released. The Complete Confection peaked at number two on the Official New Zealand Music Chart, aided by the combined sales of the two versions.

Elsewhere, The Complete Confection performed moderately as an independently charting release. In Europe, the album respectively peaked at numbers 14 and 29 on the Belgian Flanders and Wallonia charts, both managed by Ultratop. It also reached number four on the French Albums Chart and number 18 on The Official Finnish Charts. The project was less successful on the Dutch MegaCharts and the Swedish Sverigetopplistan, where it respectively peaked at numbers 44 and 48. In Oceania, it peaked at number five on the Australian ARIA Charts. According to the International Federation of the Phonographic Industry (IFPI), the album was the 50th highest selling release of 2012 with 1 million copies sold.

Accolades

Notes
 Awards listed in this list is only for new tracks featured in this album as it is a reissue album of Teenage Dream. Awards related to tracks featured previously on Teenage Dream remains on its page.

Track listing
Credits adapted from the liner notes of Teenage Dream: The Complete Confection.

Notes
  signifies a vocal producer
 "Tommie Sunshine's Megasix Smash-Up" contains elements of "California Gurls", "Teenage Dream", "Firework", "E.T.", "Last Friday Night (T.G.I.F.)" and "The One That Got Away".
 Japanese editions of the album do not include tracks 18 and 19.

Personnel
Credits adapted from AllMusic.

 Kory Aaron  – assistant, assistant engineer
 Ammo  – drums, keyboards, producer, programming
 Chris Anokute  – A&R
 Benny Blanco  – drums, keyboards, producer, programming
 Tucker Bodine  – assistant, assistant engineer
 Ronette Bowie  – A&R
 Jon Brion  – musician, producer
 Angelo Caputo  – assistant
 Eric Caudieux  – editing
 Ted Chung  – production coordination
 Steve Churchyard  – drum engineering
 Cirkut  – drums, keyboards, producer, programming, remix producer
 Angelica Cob-Baehler  – creative director
 Kenneth Colby  – drum programming, sequencing
 Will Cotton  – original paintings, photography
 Megan Dennis  – production coordination
 Steven Dennis  – assistant, assistant engineer
 Dr. Luke  – drums, executive producer, keyboards, producer, programming, remix producer
 Missy Elliott  – featured artist, vocals
 Mikkel S. Eriksen  – engineer, instrumentation
 Nicolas Essig  – assistant engineer
 Josh Freese  – drums
 Brian "Big Bass" Gardner  – mastering
 Chris Gehringer  – mastering
 Serban Ghenea  – mixing
 Clint Gibbs  – assistant, engineer
 Noah Goldstein  – vocal engineer
 Jake Gorski  – assistant
 Aniela Gottwald  – assistant, assistant engineer
 Tatiana Gottwald  – assistant, assistant engineer
 Mark Gray  – assistant, assistant engineer
 Mike Green  – programming
 John Hanes  – engineer, mixing
 Kuk Harrell  – vocal producer
 Travis Harrington  – assistant engineer
 Chandler Harrod  – assistant
 Tor Erik Hermansen  – instrumentation
 Ngoc Hoàng  – coordination
 Sam Holland  – engineer
 Josh Houghkirk  – assistant engineer
 James Hunt  – assistant
 Liz Isik  – A&R
 Jaycen Joshua  – mixing
 Greg Koller  – engineer, mixing
 Damien Lewis  – engineer
 Ed Lidow  – assistant
 Giancarlo Lino  – mixing assistant
 Charles Malone  – assistant, assistant engineer, guitar
 Adam Marcello  – celeste, percussion
 Max Martin  – drums, executive producer, keyboards, producer, programming
 Julio Miranda  – guitar
 Katie Mitzell  – production coordination
 Monte Neuble  – keyboards
 Luis Navarro  – assistant, assistant engineer
 Nick Chahwala  – bass engineer, guitar engineer, sounds
 Chris "Tek" O'Ryan  – engineer, guitar engineer
 Carlos Oyanedel  – engineer
 Brent Paschke  – guitar
 L. Leon Pendarvis  – arranger, conductor
 Katy Perry  – guitar, primary artist, vocals
 Lenny Pickett  – Saxophone
 Jo Ratcliffe  – art direction
 Irene Richter  – production coordination
 Justin Roberts  – assistant, assistant engineer
 Tim Roberts  – assistant, mixing assistant
 Phil Seaford  – assistant
 Bob Semanovich  – marketing
 Jason Sherwood  – engineer
 Vanessa Silberman  – production coordination
 Daniel Silvestri  – bass, guitar
 Snoop Dogg  – featured artist, vocals
 Stargate  – producer
 Rob Stevenson  – A&R
 C. "Tricky" Stewart  – drum programming, keyboards, producer, sequencing
 Patricia Sullivan  – mastering
 Tommie Sunshine  – remix arrangement, remix producer
 Phil Tan  – mixing
 Gavin Taylor  – art direction, design
 Brian "B-Luv" Thomas  – drum programming, engineer, guitar engineer
 Michael Thompson  – bass, guitar
 Pat Thrall  – drum programming, engineer, guitar (rhythm), vocal effect, vocoder
 Lewis Tozour  – engineer
 Randy Urbanski  – assistant, assistant engineer
 Julian Vasquez  – vocal engineer
 Sandy Vee  – instrumentation, mixing, producer
 Mark Verbos  – engineer
 Stephen Villa  – assistant
 Miles Walker  – engineer
 Fabien Waltmann  – programming, synthesizer
 Greg Wells  – drums, piano, producer, programming, synthesizer
 Kanye West  – featured artist, vocals (courtesy of Def Jam Recordings)
 Emily Wright  – engineer
 Andrew Wuepper  – engineer, guitar engineer

Charts

Weekly charts

Year-end charts

Certifications

Release history

References

Katy Perry albums
2012 compilation albums
Pop rock compilation albums
Reissue albums
Capitol Records albums
Albums produced by Benny Blanco
Albums produced by Jon Brion
Albums produced by Cirkut
Albums produced by Kuk Harrell
Albums produced by Dr. Luke
Albums produced by Max Martin
Albums produced by Stargate
Albums produced by Tricky Stewart
Albums produced by Greg Wells